The following lists events during 1994 in British Hong Kong.

Incumbents
 Monarch of the United Kingdom - Elizabeth II
 Governor - Chris Patten
 Chief Secretary - Anson Chan

Events

January

February

March

April
 20 April to 24 April - The International Junior Championships of Hong Kong were held in the territory, with Jeong-min lee, along with Hae-sung chung, winning the Boys Singles' and Doubles', and Ludmilla Varmuza, along with Fransesca La'o winning the Girls Singles' and Doubles' respectively.

May

June

July

August

September
 18 September - The first tier of the 1994 Hong Kong electoral reform, pertaining to the reform of the local councils, was carried out by the last governor of Hong Kong, Chris Patten, to broaden the electorate base of the territory.

October

November

December

Undated
TeleEye company is founded.

See also
List of Hong Kong films of 1994

References

 
Years of the 20th century in Hong Kong
Hong Kong
Hong Kong
1994 in British Overseas Territories